Animal control may refer to:

 The work of an animal shelter or "pound", a facility that houses or disposes of stray, lost, abandoned or surrendered animals
 The work of a US animal control service
 Pest control, killing or otherwise controlling the population of species regarded as pests
 Animal Control (TV series), a 2023 American TV sitcom on Fox